Åssiden Idrettsforening (nicknamed "Åssia") is a Norwegian sports club from Drammen, Buskerud. It has sections for association football and handball, and skiing, previously also bandy.

It was founded in 1937. Åssiden was a part of Lier at the time, but was later incorporated into Drammen municipality.

The men's football team currently plays in 3. divisjon, the fourth tier of the Norwegian football league system, since their promotion from the 2019 4. divisjon. The club last played in 2. divisjon in 1998, and in the 1. divisjon as late as in 1993.

References

 Official site

External links
 Åssiden Stadion - Nordic Stadiums

Football clubs in Norway
Sport in Buskerud
Sport in Drammen
Lier, Norway
Association football clubs established in 1937
Bandy clubs established in 1937
1937 establishments in Norway